Guzmania striata is a species of plant in the family Bromeliaceae. It is endemic to Ecuador.  Its natural habitat is subtropical or tropical moist lowland forests. It is threatened by habitat loss.

References

striata
Endemic flora of Ecuador
Critically endangered flora of South America
Taxonomy articles created by Polbot